Chips most commonly refers to:
 Chips or french fries, long chunks of potato that have been deep fried or baked
 Chips, or crisps, a snack food in the form of thin crispy slices
 Potato chips, thin crispy slices of deep-fried or baked potatoes

Chips may also refer to:

People 
 Chips (nickname), various people
 Chips Mackinolty (born 1954), Australian artist

Arts, entertainment, and media

Music
 Chips (album), from the eponymous Swedish group
 Chips (band), a Swedish pop band
 The Chips, a short-lived New York City doo-wop vocal group
 Chips, Irish male/female vocal group, including Linda Martin

Television
 CHiPs, a television series about the California Highway Patrol
 "CHiPs (Space Ghost Coast to Coast)", an episode of Space Ghost Coast to Coast

Other arts, entertainment, and media
 CHiPs (film), a 2017 film version of the series
 Chips (literary magazine), the award-winning literary and art magazine of Bethesda-Chevy Chase High School
 Chips, a separate pull-out section of Whizzer and Chips, a British comic published from 1969 to 1990
 Mr. Chips, an English schoolteacher in  James Hilton's novella Goodbye, Mr. Chips and its film adaptations

Businesses
 Chips (coffee shop), a historic coffee shop in Los Angeles, California
 Chips (company), based in Åland, Finland, producer of potato chips and other food products
 Chips and Technologies (often stylized as CHIPS on their products), one of the first fabless microsprocessor companies
 Clearing House Interbank Payments System, a U.S. payment settlement scheme

Computing and technology 
 Chips, monolithic integrated circuits without their packaging, the bare semiconductor dice
 Common Hybrid Interface Protocol System (CHIPS), defines a computer network's interface and protocol systems used in serial and wireless communications
 CHIPS (satellite), Cosmic Hot Interstellar Plasma Spectrometer Satellite, a satellite launched in 2003

Other uses 
 Children's Health Insurance Program
 Chips (dog), an American wardog who served in World War II
 Chips, Manchester, an apartment building
 The Chips (train), a passenger train that operates over the Blue Mountains between Lithgow and Sydney
 The CHIPS Act, a bill included in William M. (Mac) Thornberry National Defense Authorization Act for Fiscal Year 2021
 Woodchips

See also 
 Chip (disambiguation)